World Assembly of Islamic Awakening is an Islamic-assembly which was formed in order to ensure the continuity/development of the "Islamic Awakening Movement" by increasing communication, interaction and transfer of experiences. The permanent secretariat of the assembly is located in Tehran, Iran. This Islamic assembly started its activities in 2011. Ali Akbar Velayati the senior adviser to the Supreme Leader (of Iran) in international affairs is the secretary-general of the convention(s).

The World Assembly of Islamic Awakening possesses 40 members, and was established simultaneously with the wave of Islamic awakening began in Tehran; with the goal of "preventing regional developments from deviating from their path" and "unity of the Islamic Ummah and rapprochement between religions", in addition to "transparency/information/confrontation with anti-Islamic currents" that seek to challenge the Islamic awakening.

See also 
 The World Forum for Proximity of Islamic Schools of Thought
 Islamic Culture and Communication Organization
 Ahl Al-Bayt World Assembly

References

External links 
 World Assembly of Islamic Awakening stresses importance of Muslim unity

Islam and politics
Islamic states
Shia–Sunni relations
International Islamic organizations
International organisations based in Iran